Antoine Cash (born March 5, 1982) is a former American football linebacker. He was signed by the Atlanta Falcons as an undrafted free agent in 2005. He played college football at Southern Miss.

Early years
Cash attended South Delta High School in Rolling Fork, Mississippi, and was a student and a letterman in football. In football, as a senior, he started as an outside linebacker and as a running back and rushed for 1,378 yards. After his senior season, Cash was named to The Clarion-Ledger's "Top 40 Recruits in Mississippi" and was invited to participate in the Alabama/Mississippi All-Star Classic. Is now the Defensive Coordinator and Assistant Head Coach at Canton High School in Canton, Mississippi. He led the tigers to a turn around 6–7 season alongside Head Coach Calvin Bolton. In previous years the team was straggling the edge with only winning 3 to 4 games a year. With his first opportunity as DC he led Canton to the best start in the last two decades, with a 4–1 record. Cash will be returning this year with the passion to improve the Canton team even better.

External links
Tampa Bay Buccaneers bio

1982 births
Living people
People from Anguilla, Mississippi
American football linebackers
Southern Miss Golden Eagles football players
Atlanta Falcons players
Tampa Bay Buccaneers players